Big Fish: Music from the Motion Picture is the thirty-fifth soundtrack album by American music composer Danny Elfman. It was released on December 23, 2003, by Sony Classical to promote the 2003 American fantasy comedy-drama film Big Fish.

The album was nominated for the Academy Award and the Golden Globe Award for Best Original Score.

Track listing
"Man of the Hour" - Pearl Jam (3:45)
"Dinah" - Bing Crosby (2:17)
"Everyday" - Buddy Holly (2:09)
"All Shook Up" - Elvis Presley (1:58)
"Five O'Clock World" - The Vogues (2:10)
"Ramblin' Man" - The Allman Brothers Band (4:57)
"Let's Work Together" - Canned Heat (3:13)
"Pictures" (0:45)
"Big Fish (Titles)" (4:32)
"Shoe Stealing" (0:54)
"Underwater" (1:53)
"Sandra's Theme" (2:22)
"The Growing Montage" (2:40)
"Leaving Spectre" (1:59)
"Return to Spectre" (2:12)
"Rebuilding" (1:18)
"The Journey Home" (2:10)
"In the Tub" (1:18)
"Sandra's Farewell" (1:16)
"Finale" (11:10)
"End Titles" (2:41)
"Jenny's Theme" (1:45)
"Twice the Love (Siamese Twin's Song)" - Bobbi Page and Candice Rump (1:49)

References

Danny Elfman soundtracks
2003 soundtrack albums
Sony Classical Records soundtracks
Comedy film soundtracks
Drama film soundtracks